Speed Crazed is a 1926 American silent sports action film directed by Duke Worne and starring Billy Sullivan, Andrée Tourneur and Joseph W. Girard.

Synopsis 
A man is forced to be a getaway driver for a criminal gang. Arrested he manages to escape and flee town. Later, after becoming a racing driver his former connections come back to haunt him.

Cast 
 Billy Sullivan as Billy Meeks
 Andrée Tourneur as Eloise Harfer
 Joseph W. Girard as Maclyn Harfer
 Harry Maynard as Mr. Payton
 Albert J. Smith as Dave Marker

References

Bibliography 
 Munden, Kenneth White. The American Film Institute Catalog of Motion Pictures Produced in the United States, Part 1. University of California Press, 1997.

External links 
 

1920s action films
1920s sports films
1926 films
American auto racing films
American silent feature films
Films directed by Duke Worne
Rayart Pictures films
Sports action films
1920s American films
Silent action films
Silent sports films